Berres is a surname. Notable people with the surname include:

Christian Joseph Berres (1796–1844), Austrian anatomist
Heinz-Edgar Berres (1920–1943), German World War II flying ace
Luis Batlle Berres (1897–1964), Uruguayan politician
Mathias J. Berres (1863–1954), American politician
Ray Berres (1907–2007), American baseball player and coach

See also
Berre (disambiguation)